Fearless Tiger (also known as Black Pearls in some countries) is a 1991 Canadian martial arts movie, directed by Ron Hulme.

Plot

Jalal Merhi, Bolo Yeung and Monika Schnarre star in the tale of a martial artist (Merhi) who studies under an old master (Yeung) in the hopes of avenging his brother's death at the hands of a drug ring.

Release
The movie was released in Canada in 1991, under the Black Pearls name, but was not released in the United States until 1994, where it was released directly to video by Imperial Entertainment under the Fearless Tiger name. In Canada, the movie flopped at the box office. The movie has been released on DVD in the UK, and in the United States as a double feature with Death Machines from EastWest Entertainment. A new special edition DVD is in the works, but as of April 4, 2011, nothing else has been announced.

External links
 
 2005 fan review

1991 films
1991 action thriller films
1991 martial arts films
Canadian action thriller films
English-language Canadian films
Martial arts tournament films
Underground fighting films
1990s English-language films
1990s Canadian films